The Beloved Vagabond is a 1923 British romantic drama film directed by Fred LeRoy Granville and starring Carlyle Blackwell, Madge Stuart, Jessie Matthews and Phyllis Titmuss. The film is based on the 1906 novel The Beloved Vagabond by William John Locke.

Plot
As described in a film magazine review, in order to save the father of Joanna Rushworth, the young woman that he loves, from financial ruin, the wealthy Gaston de Nerac signs a paper giving her up to Comte de Verneuil, whom she then weds. Living as a tramp musician, he wanders through Brittany with Asticot and Blanquette, boy and girl, the latter an orphan. Later, the Comte dies. Joanna and her former lover meet again. Realizing that they are no longer suited to each other, he marries Blanquette.

Cast

References

External links
The Beloved Vagabond (1923) at IMDB
The Beloved Vagabond (1923) at SilentEra

1923 films
Films directed by Fred LeRoy Granville
1923 romantic drama films
British silent feature films
British black-and-white films
Films based on British novels
British remakes of American films
British romantic drama films
1920s English-language films
1920s British films
Silent romantic drama films